The Lively Ones were an instrumental surf rock band from USA, active in Southern California in the 1960s. They played live mostly in California and Arizona. They recorded for Del-Fi records with production from Bob Keane. They recorded mostly cover songs, but there were a few originals.

Their 1963 song "Surf Rider" (written by Nokie Edwards from The Ventures) was featured in the final sequence as well as the end credits of Quentin Tarantino's 1994 film Pulp Fiction.

They are best known with these members:
Lead guitar: Jim Masoner
Rhythm guitar: Ed Chiaverini
Bass guitar: Ron Griffith
Saxophone: Joel Willenbring
Drums: Tim Fitzpatrick

Currently, John Benton plays rhythm/alternate lead guitar and Tracy Sands plays bass guitar.
Recent live shows have featured Earthman on rhythm/alternate lead guitar.

Discography

Albums
 Surf Rider! (Del-Fi DFLP-1226, 4/63)
 Surf Drums (Del-Fi DFLP-1231, 6/63)
 Surf City (Del-Fi DFLP-1237, 8/63)
 The Great Surf Hits! (Del-Fi DFLP-1238, 9/63) 
 Surfin' South of the Border (Del-Fi DFLP-1240, 11/64) shared album with the Surf Mariachis
 Bugalu Party (MGM SE-4449, 1967)

CD compilations
 Hang Five! The Best of the Lively Ones (Del-Fi DFCD-9004, 1995)
 Heads Up! The Best of the Lively Ones, Vol. 2 (Del-Fi DFCD-9005, 1999)

Singles
 "Crying Guitar" // "Guitarget" (Del-Fi DF-4184, 10/62)
 "Miserlou" // "Livin'" (Del-Fi DF-4189, 11/62)
 "Surf Rider" // "Surfer's Lament" (Del-Fi DF-4196, 2/63)
 "Rik-A-Tic" // "Surfer Boogie" (Del-Fi DF-4205, 4/63)
 "High Tide" // "Goofy Foot" (Del-Fi DF-4210, 6/63)
 "Telstar Surf" // "Surf City" (Del-Fi DF-4217, 7/63) 
 "Exodus" // "Surfing Memories" (Del-Fi DF-4224, 10/63)
 "Night And Day" // "Hey, Scrounge" (Smash S-1880, 2/64)
 "Bugalu Movement" // "Take It While You Can" (MGM K-13691, 3/67)

Notes

References

External links

Surf music groups
Rock music groups from California
American instrumental musical groups
Del-Fi Records artists